Terry Clark may refer to:

 Terry Clark (RAF officer) (1919–2020), British Royal Air Force veteran of the Battle of Britain
 Terry Clark (drug smuggler) (1944–1983), New Zealand-born drug smuggler and convicted murderer
 Terry Clark (musician) (born 1946), American Christian music singer-songwriter
 Terry D. Clark (1956–2001), American convicted murderer
 Terry Clark (baseball) (born 1960), American baseball player

See also
 Terri Clark (born 1968), Canadian country music singer
 Terry Clarke (disambiguation)
 Sir Terence Clark (born 1934), British diplomat
 Terence Clarke (disambiguation)